Condado is a city located in the state of Pernambuco, Brazil. Located  at 69.3 km away from Recife, capital of the state of Pernambuco. Has an estimated (IBGE 2020) population of 26,590 inhabitants.

Geography
 State - Pernambuco
 Region - Zona da mata Pernambucana
 Boundaries - Itambé   (N);  Nazaré da Mata and Itaquitinga   (S);  Goiana   (E);  Aliança   (W)
 Area - 89.64 km2
 Elevation - 129 m
 Hydrography - Goiana River
 Vegetation - Subperenifólia forest
 Climate - Hot tropical and humid
 Distance to Recife - 69.3 km

Economy
The main economic activities in Condado are based in agribusiness, especially sugarcane and livestock such as cattle and chickens.

Economic indicators

Economy by Sector
2006

Health indicators

References

Municipalities in Pernambuco